Digitalism may refer to:  

Digitalism (band), a German electronic music group
Digitalism (medicine), a medical condition caused by digitalis poisoning
Digitalism, or digitality, the condition of living in a digital culture